Colville Lake (K'áhbamį́túé meaning "ptarmigan net place") is a settlement corporation located in the Sahtu Region of the Northwest Territories, Canada. This settlement is the administrative office of the Behdzi Ahda band government. The community is likely named for Hudson's Bay Company Governor Andrew Colvile.

Demographics 

The GNWT has reported that the majority, 148 people, were Indigenous, Sahtu Dene. They are represented by the Behdzi Ahda' First Nation and belong to the Sahtu Dene Council

Geography and climate
The terrain is characterized by black spruce and tends to be small and sparse. Other vegetation includes mosses, lichens, grasses and alders. The winter months begin in October and last until April. The month of May is considered the spring or breakup period. By the end of May or Early June the lakes and rivers are normally free of ice, although this varies. June, July and August are considered the summer months and temperatures range in the mid twenties. At times the temperature has climbed into the low thirties. By late September, freeze up is well underway again.

History

The community of Colville Lake is the ancestral homeland of the Hareskin (Sahtu) Dene who still inhabit the area. The Hareskin Dene were never very numerous, with a population of less than one thousand people, living in six or seven bands, at the time of European contact. The Hareskins were a peaceful group, known for their use of small animals such as the Arctic hare. Located within the traditional homeland of the North Slave Dene tribe, Colville Lake is a completely traditional community in every sense. Although Father Émile Petitot brought Christianity to the area in 1864, organization of the community did not occur until 1962 when a Roman Catholic mission was established by Bern Will Brown. Brown came north from US in 1948 as a priest, then as painter and bush pilot.

Today
Today you can visit the site of the mission Our Lady of the Snows. One main attraction is a fishing lodge. Colville Lake is home to grayling, trout and pike fish. There is also a small art gallery and museum located next to the lodge. Rounding off the town, there is a bed and breakfast and two stores.

Services

Kapami Co-op is the only food retailer and hosts the post office for the community. Locals either resort to hunting, purchasing food flown in or drive to Norman Wells or Fort Good Hope when winter roads are in use.

Colville Lake School is the only school providing K-12 education needs. The main log building houses junior grades and portable for older students.

The community has a basic health station staffed by a nurse with telehealth access from Norman Wells. Medivac transfer for patients when advance care is required either to Norman Wells (health clinic) or Yellowknife (Stanton Territorial Hospital).

There is no local policing and only month patrol from RCMP detachment in Fort Good Hope.

Colville Lake had no fire services and became a concern after 2014 fire and previous fires were left to burn out. Since then the community is staffed by a single mini pumper.

Transportation

Colville Lake/Tommy Kochon Aerodrome is located outside the community. The airport connects with Fort Good Hope and Norman Wells only.

Within the community is Colville Lake Water Aerodrome using the lake as landing area. This facility is operated by local Arctic Co-operatives Limited store.

The old airstrip  is located inside Coville Lake with old runway (10/28) still visible. Since closing in 2012 solar panels have been built at end of the former runway to provide alternate power supply to Colville Lake.

Roads in Colville Lake provide local access only. A winter road connects with Fort Good Hope for nine months of the year.

See also
Colville Lake/Tommy Kochon Aerodrome
Colville Lake Water Aerodrome

References

External links

 NWT Tourism for Colville Lake

Communities in the Sahtu Region
Dene communities
Populated places in Arctic Canada
Road-inaccessible communities of the Northwest Territories